Saravana is a 2006 Indian Tamil-language action romance film directed by K. S. Ravikumar. It is a love story set in the backdrop of a village starring Silambarasan and Jyothika, with Five Star Krishna, Vivek, and Prakash Raj in supporting roles. The film was a high-budget production under Deivanai Movies and the soundtrack was composed by Srikanth Deva. It was released on Pongal day in 2006. It is the Tamil remake of 2005 Telugu film, Bhadra starring Ravi Teja and Meera Jasmine.

Plot 

The film begins with the engagement of Saravana's sister Divya. The house is full of joy and laughter, awaiting Saravana's return from college. However, when Saravana returns, the family members are shocked. He has brought home a distraught and frightened girl, whom he introduces as his friend, Sadhana. The marriage preparations continue with everyone wondering who Sadhana is. However, Saravana's uncle cannot control his emotions. He wants his daughter Sathya to marry Saravana and is afraid that Sadhana will spoil this. Eventually, Saravana's uncle confronts him about Sadhana. Saravana gets upset, and an argument ensues. Later, as Saravana and Sadhana go to a restaurant to eat, a gang comes. Saravana chases them for a while and beats all of them up. Realizing that he has left Sadhana behind, Saravana returns to the restaurant. However, Sadhana is not there. Frightened, he returns home to find her there. She was rescued by her brother's assistant Velu. Finally, Saravana's father Bhoopathi forces him to tell them what is going on. A flashback then begins.

Saravana and Krishna are close friends. One day, Saravana sees Krishna's sister, Sadhana, on a video recording and immediately falls in love with her. At that moment, she is studying in London. After learning that she would be going home for the holidays, he follows Krishna home for the holidays in an attempt to woo her. When he arrives at the village, Saravana is greeted by Krishna's elder brother Soundarapandiyan. Soundarapandi's wife Uma Maheshwari treats Saravana like a brother and dotes on him. Eventually, Saravana is told about the caste clashes occurring in the village. Soon, Sadhana arrives. Saravana tries hard to impress her but faces many difficulties. Strangely, he does not tell her about his love and devotion. However, the other family members eventually become aware of his love and approve of him. When Sadhana takes Saravana to the temple for a visit without anyone's knowledge, the rival group, led by Duraisingam, is attacked by Sadhana's brother's gang. One member of Duraisingam's group then holds Sadhana hostage and threatens to kill her. In a swift action of bravery and skill, Saravana knocks down the group member.

After this incident, Soundarapandi tells Saravana why things are so violent in the village. He explains how both he and his wife are both master's degree holders from a prestigious university. Unfortunately, due to the village's nature, the rivalry is deadly and fatal. He ultimately says that even though the villages are violent, he will remain a noble person with high ideals. At the temple festival, Soundarapandi carries a plate with the sari that Saravana bought for Sadhana before coming to the village. He wants to seek the blessings of the goddess Amman for the marriage. However, Sadhana is unaware of this. Trouble ensues when Duraisingam's gang kills the rest of Sadhana's family, forcing Saravana and Sadhana to flee the village. Soundarapandi's last wish was for Saravana to take care of Sadhana and marry her.

The story shifts back to Saravana's household, and Saravana plans to send Sadhana to London because the enemy will not be able to find her there. His family does not approve because they know of his love for her. By now, Sadhana has also fallen in love with him and his family. However, she agrees to leave because she thinks that he has no such feelings for her. Velu, who managed to escape the village, gives Sadhana the green saree, saying that it was supposed to be her brother's gift to her.

On the day when Sadhana is supposed to leave for London, she wears the green sari. At the airport, Sadhana meets Saravana's college mate, who tells her about Saravana's devotion for her. The girl also tells Sadhana that the green sari was bought by Saravana after much deliberation, and that she had to endure his torture of visiting many shops to find the perfect sari. Sadhana is surprised. She realizes that she cannot leave Saravana and leaves the airport. She manages to find Saravana, who is fighting the villains. Before Duraisingam can kill Saravana, Velu kills him. At the end, Saravana and Sadhana embrace, and the film ends.

Cast 

 Silambarasan as Saravanaa
 Jyothika as Sadhana
 Five Star Krishna as Krishna
 Prakash Raj as Soundarapandi
 Vivek as V. C. Damodaran (VCD)
 Eashwari Rao as Uma Maheshwari, Soundarapandi's wife
 Ravi Kale as Duraisingam
 Radha Ravi as Bhoopathi, Saravanaa's father
 Sriranjini as Lakshmi, Saravanaa's mother
 Nagesh as Varadharajan, Saravanaa's grandfather
 Nizhalgal Ravi as Purushothaman, Saravanaa's uncle
 Tharika as Divya, Saravanaa's elder sister
 Devadarshini as Amudha, Saravanaa's elder sister-in-law
 Meghna Naidu as Sathya, Saravanaa's cousin
 Brahmaji as Velu, Soundarapandi's sidekick
 Subbaraju as Vanjaravelu, Duraisingam's younger brother
 Akhila as Savithri, Velu's younger sister and Krishna's lover
 Ponnambalam as Veerapandi 
 K. S. Ravikumar as Man in Train
 Besant Ravi as Manikkam

Production 
Amudha Durairaj produced this film under the banner Deivanai Movies.This is the second time that Silambarasan and Jyothika are coming together after the success of Manmadhan (2004). Saravana is the remake of Bhadra, an action-oriented entertainer, which has Prakash Raj, Easwari Rao, Brahmaji, and Subbaraju re-enacting their roles they had played in the original Telugu version.

A song was shot with Meghna Naidu and Silambarasan on sets erected at AVM, Prasad Studios and Mohan Studios.

Soundtrack 
There are six songs composed by Srikanth Deva in his second collaboration with Silambarasan after Kuththu (2004). The song "Saa Boo Three" was reused from the song "Sa Sye" from the original Telugu film.

References

External links 

Tamil remakes of Telugu films
2006 films
Films directed by K. S. Ravikumar
2000s Tamil-language films
Films scored by Srikanth Deva
Indian romantic action films
Indian romantic drama films
2000s romantic action films
2006 romantic drama films